Edward Alfred Cecil Henry Brown (4 October 1927 – 4 April 1996) was an English professional football centre forward who played in the Football League for Aldershot.

References 

1927 births
1996 deaths
Footballers from St Pancras, London
English footballers
Association football forwards
Brentford F.C. players
Torquay United F.C. players
Aldershot F.C. players
English Football League players